Ettore Bernabei (16 May 1921 – 13 August 2016) was an Italian television director and producer.

Biography

Early career

Ettore Bernabei began his career as editor in chief of a Florentine newspaper with Christian Democratic ties called the Giornale del Mattino. Then, from 1956 to 1960, he was editor in chief of another Christian Democratic newspaper Il Popolo. Bernabei was also a close friend and associate of five-time prime minister and important Christian Democrat Amintore Fanfani.

Career with RAI

In 1961, Fanfani appointed Bernabei to be the Director General of RAI – Radiotelevisione italiana, where he remained until 1974. He took over RAI in the midst of an Italian Constitutional Court decision, renewing RAI's monopoly over television broadcasting. During his tenure as Director General, he furthered the tight grasp that the Christian Democratic party held over the broadcaster. His aim was to entertain and educate all viewers, while creating larger public support for the Christian Democracy.

Opponents charged Bernabei and RAI with being too intertwined with the governing party. In order to create a seemingly more balanced RAI and to appease these opponents, Bernabei began to hire journalists with ties to other parties. This was merely a symbolic gesture, as he largely ignored the ideas of these new employees and stuck to his own agenda. Bernabei's strategy greatly increased the size of RAI, but ultimately backfired for two reasons: RAI became full of political enemies and RAI's Christian Democrats split into competing groups. As a result of his hiring policies, he began to lose his once strong control over the broadcaster, and by the time he left in 1974, RAI was in need of reform. Despite all this, Bernabei's leadership is often regretted as a form of entertainment inspired by pedagogical principles, which has been missing hitherto in the Italian television.

Post-RAI Career
From 1974 to 1991 Bernabei was the managing director and chairman of Italstat. In 1991, with a group of Italian entrepreneurs he started the television production company Lux Vide, which is famous for series such as The Bible and Jesus. Since February 2007, he has served on the advisory board for T-Systems Italia SpA. He died on 13 August 2016.

Awards

In 1966, Ettore Bernabei was named Cavaliere di Gran Croce by President of the Italian Republic Giuseppe Saragat.

References 

1921 births
2016 deaths
Italian television directors
Rai (broadcaster) people
University of Florence alumni
Opus Dei members